The Empire State Roar was a women's tackle football team in Rochester, New York. They played at East High School (Rochester, New York). The team was a member of the Women's Professional Football League (WPFL) for three football seasons, 2005–2007.

History
The Empire State Roar followed the Rochester Raptors of the National Women's Football Association (NWFA) and the Syracuse Sting of the WPFL both of which had folded in 2004. 

The Roar was established in 2005 by former Rochester Raptors and Syracuse Sting lineswoman Sandra Rogers, who was said to have merged the two teams into one. Shawn R. Stauber was head coach. The team joined the WPFL as an exhibition team in 2005, and became a full member of the league in 2006. 

The Roar's most successful season was 2007 when, under Head Coach John Evans, they won the Northern Division with an 8-0 regular season. The team fell in the playoffs to the eventual league champion SoCal Scorpions. Notably, Empire State Roar home games were broadcast on Finger Lakes TV Channel 12 for the 2007 season.

The WPFL ceased operations after the 2007 season, leaving the Roar without a league. The team did not play in 2008. Organizational efforts to revive the Roar in the Independent Women's Football League and the Women's Football Alliance in 2009 and 2010 all failed, and the team folded permanently.

Season-By-Season 

|-
| colspan="6" align="center" | Empire State Roar (WPFL)
|-
|2005 || 2 || 4 || 0 || Exhibition Season || --
|-
|2006 || 4 || 3 || 0 || 2nd American East || --
|-
|2007 || 8 || 1 || 0 || 1st American East || Lost American Conference Championship (SoCal)
|-
!Totals || 14 || 8 || 0
|colspan="2"|

References

Women's Football Alliance teams
Sports in Rochester, New York
American football teams in New York (state)
American football teams established in 2005
American football teams disestablished in 2007
2005 establishments in New York (state)
2007 disestablishments in New York (state)
Women's sports in New York (state)